Arcane Shadows is an adventure for the 2nd edition of the Advanced Dungeons & Dragons fantasy role-playing game, and released in 1992. The module was written by Bill Slavicsek and published by TSR, Inc.

Contents
The adventure's packaging is similar to "previous Dark Sun modules". It provides useful reference materials for the dungeon master, to include a non-player character table, and extensive maps. It also contains a short work of fiction for context as well as comparatively good artwork related to earlier modules.

The contents of the module are as follows: Arcane Shadows places four to six 5th to 8th level characters in the City-State of Urik. In this installment, Tyr has been overthrown, and the armies of Urik have been turned back. The characters receive a summons from the Veiled Alliance, and are pursued across the desert by templars. During their flight, they receive aid from a legendary slave tribe, encounter a lost valley, and try to help the Veiled Alliance finish a ceremony that may set Athas on the path of rebirth.

Publication history
Arcane Shadows was preceded by the modules Freedom and Road to Urik, and complements the Prism Pentad works.

Reception
Berin Kinsman reviewed Arcane Shadows in the March/April 1993 issue of White Wolf Magazine, assessing it as an "above-par AD&D module" that "still doesn't quite justify the cost", and rating it a 3 out of 5. He noted that the additional $3–4 for Dark Sun modules at the time appeared to only pay for "fancy packaging" versus content. However, Kinsman stated that "Serious [Dark Sun] fans might find this worth a read even if they don't intend to run it."

References

Dark Sun
Role-playing game supplements introduced in 1992